Church's is a high-end footwear manufacturer that was founded in 1873, by Thomas Church, in Northampton, England. In 1999 the company came under the control of Italian luxury fashion house Prada in a US$170 million deal.

History
Between the two world wars, Church's became actively involved in the development of the footwear industry in general. In 1919, the British Boot, Shoe and Allied Trades Research Association was created with Church's as a founder-member. As a result of this partnership, the Northampton Technical College was established in 1925. This went on to become the University of Northampton in 2005.

The family business was taken over by Prada in 1999, in a US$170 million deal,
and has since expanded its outlets overseas. In 2014 the company employed 650 people. The same year, Church's took over adjacent premises in St James Road, formerly a tram and later a bus depot, in anticipation of further expansion which was expected to create up to 140 more jobs.

Some have criticized Prada's management of Church's, citing a shift towards a fashion company moving away from traditional designs and workmanship resulting in gradual decrease of quality.

In 2016, the Company appointed a new CEO. Despite the openings of new luxury boutiques and the uplift of retail price, Church & Co reported losses and reduced the workforce in its plant in Northampton.

Location
Its main installations are located in the St James area of Northampton, with an estimated production capacity of 5,000 pairs per week, 70% of which are exported all over the world. Besides products sold to resellers and individual customers, the company also has several of its own retail stores, including ones in Jermyn Street, London, George Street, Edinburgh, Pacific Place, Hong Kong, and County Arcade, Leeds. In 2014 it had 50 stores across central and northern Europe, Hong Kong, China, Singapore and Japan.

Notable customers
British Prime Minister Tony Blair had a "lucky pair" of Church's black 310 brogues, which he wore to every session of Prime Minister's Questions for ten years.

During Pierce Brosnan's tenure as James Bond, various selections of dress shoes from the Church's range were used in production. Lindy Hemming, who was the costume designer, explained the choice of Church's shoes as having the appropriate weight to complement the silhouette of the tailored Brioni suits she had commissioned for Bond.

Mr Bean (portrayed by Rowan Atkinson) wore a pair of black Church's shoes on the TV show and in the films.

References

External links

1873 establishments in England
Manufacturing companies based in Northampton
Companies established in 1873
English brands
Luxury brands
Privately held companies of England
Shoe brands
Shoe companies of the United Kingdom
Prada